Rumbula may refer to:

 Rumbula, Riga, a neighbourhood in Riga, Latvia
 Rumbula, Stopiņi Municipality, a village in Stopiņi Municipality, Latvia
 Rumbula Air Base, an air base located southeast of the city centre of Riga, Latvia
 Rumbula massacre, part of the Holocaust in Latvia near Riga